Eefje Depoortere (born 16 June 1987), known professionally as Sjokz, is a Belgian television presenter, reporter, and esports player who is currently the host of the League of Legends European Championship. She has also hosted multiple League of Legends World Championships.

Early life 
Depoortere grew up in Belgium as an only child. She studied sports journalism at university.

Career 

Depoortere was formerly a competitive Unreal Tournament '99 player and competed in several LANs and won several ClanBase EuroCups with the Belgian national team. The name "Sjokz" is a phonetic spelling of "shocks" in Dutch, and derives from her use of the Shock Rifle in Unreal Tournament.

Depoortere began working as a freelance journalist producing esports-related content for SK Gaming and ESFi World. She completed her Master's degree in history (2009), journalism (2010) and a teaching degree (2011) from Ghent University.

Depoortere was crowned as the winner of the 2009 Aardbeienprinses van Beervelde pageant and was the third-place finalist in the 2011 Miss Style Belgium pageant.

It was due to esports journalist Travis Gafford's YouTube show Whose League is it Anyway? that Depoortere became known in the community. Due to her popularity on WLIA she was later hired to be the host of the European League of Legends Championship Series. She has often thanked Gafford for helping her establish herself in esports. Depoortere is also known for the YouTube show Summoner Recap on the SK Gaming's YouTube channel, which was one of the first League of Legends shows. In 2013, Depoortere hosted the World Championship in Staples Center in Los Angeles, California. She has also hosted the 2015 and 2019 World Championship, both held in Europe, and the 2020 World Championship held in China, but cast remotely in Berlin due to the COVID-19 Pandemic. Depoortere won the "Best Esports Host" award at The Game Awards 2018, The Game Awards 2019, and The Game Awards 2020.

Awards and nominations

References

External links 
 Sjokz on Twitch.tv

Esports commentators
Living people
1987 births
Entertainers from Bruges
Belgian sports broadcasters
Flemish journalists
Belgian beauty pageant winners
Belgian people of Dutch descent
Ghent University alumni
League of Legends commentators
Women in esports
Esports journalists
The Game Awards winners